George Henry Shelton (1894 – 1960) was an English footballer who played at inside-right for Wellington Town and Port Vale. He was the younger brother of Jack Shelton.

Career
Shelton played for Wellington Town, before joining Port Vale as an amateur in August 1916. He played 26 games, scoring seven goals in the war time leagues before being conscripted in September 1917. After surviving the war he returned to Vale in February 1920, signing as a professional the following month. However, he proved unable to regain his place and after making two Second Division appearances in the Football League was released at the end of the 1919–20 season.

Career statistics
Source:

References

1894 births
1960 deaths
Footballers from Wolverhampton
English footballers
Association football inside forwards
Telford United F.C. players
Port Vale F.C. players
English Football League players
British Army personnel of World War I